Robin Leamy may refer to:
 Robin Leamy (bishop) (1934–2022), New Zealand Roman Catholic bishop
 Robin Leamy (swimmer) (born 1961), American former swimmer